Joran Triest (born 8 April 1997) is a Belgian footballer who plays for Hamme in the Belgian Second Amateur Division as a forward.

Club career
Joran Triest started his career with Lokeren.

References

1997 births
Living people
Belgian footballers
K.S.C. Lokeren Oost-Vlaanderen players
Belgian Pro League players
Association football forwards